The Church of St. Joan of Arc is a Roman Catholic parish church under the authority of the Roman Catholic Archdiocese of New York, located at 174th Street at Stratford Avenue, The Bronx, New York City. It was established in 1949.

References 

Christian organizations established in 1949
Roman Catholic churches in the Bronx
1949 establishments in New York City